Dominique Clément is a Professor of Sociology at the University of Alberta and a member of the Royal Society of Canada's College of New Scholars, Artists and Scientists. He is a Canadian historical sociologist who specializes in human rights and social movements including the use of digital tools for research in the humanities and social sciences. He has also been a visiting scholar at the University of Sydney in Australia, Beijing Normal University in China, KU-Leuven University in Belgium, and NUI Galway in Ireland.

Clément is the founder and creator of Canada's Human Rights History, which is a popular teaching and research portal on the history of human rights in Canada. His Facebook (HistoryOfRights) and Twitter (@HistoryOfRights) sites explore current affairs in human rights and social movements in Canada. He was the Principal Investigator of a national research team that included numerous community partners engaged in an examination of the relationship between public funding and the non-profit sector in Canada: State Funding for Social Movements. One of the major deliverables of this project was an archive and searchable public database of government grants to NGOs since the 1960s.

Biography
Clément earned his B.A. (Honours) from Queen's University at Kingston, a Master of Arts from University of British Columbia, and his PhD from Memorial University of Newfoundland. He was a postdoctoral fellow at the University of Birmingham and the University of Victoria. 

Clément is a public intellectual whose work has been profiled on radio, television and print media including the CBC, Radio-Canada, The Globe and Mail, National Post, Toronto Star, Edmonton Journal and the Vancouver Sun. He is the author of award-winning books including Canada’s Rights Revolution: Social Movements and Social Change (UBC Press, 2008) (reprinted in Japanese by Akashi Press), Equality Deferred: Sex Discrimination and British Columbia’s Human Rights State (UBC Press, 2014), Human Rights in Canada: A History (WLU Press, 2016), and Debating Rights Inflation: A Sociology of Human Rights (WLU Press, 2018). He is also the co-editor for Alberta's Human Rights Story (John Humphrey Centre, 2012) and Debating Dissent: Canada and the Sixties (University of Toronto Press, 2012). Clément is the author of numerous articles on human rights, social movements, immigration policy, public finances, the Olympic Games, Freedom of information law, national security and counter-terrorism policy, legal history, labour history, and women’s history. 

Clément has consulted for the Canadian Human Rights Commission, the Canadian Museum for Human Rights and the Canadian Heritage Information Network. He is a former board member of the Canadian Civil Liberties Association, Centre for Constitutional Studies, the https://ccwgh-cchfg.com Canadian Committee on Women’s History], John Humphrey Centre for Peace and Human Rights, Association for Canadian Studies, L’Institut d’études canadiennes de l’Université de l’Alberta, Canadian Committee on Labour History, British Columbia Civil Liberties Association and the Canadian Historical Association. He is a Research Affiliate with the Canadian Network for Research on Terrorism, Security and Society as well as a Co-Investigator with the Child and Youth Refugee Research Coalition.

Publications
 Debating Rights Inflation in Canada: A Sociology of Human Rights (2018, Wilfrid Laurier University Press) 
 Human Rights in Canada: A History (2016, Wilfrid Laurier University Press) 
 Equality Deferred: Sex Discrimination and British Columbia’s Human Rights State (2014, University of British Columbia Press)
 Canada’s Rights Revolution: Social Movements and Social Change (2008, University of British Columbia Press). Translated and Published by Akashi Press.
 Debating Dissent: Canada and the Sixties (2012, University of Toronto Press)
 Alberta's Human Rights Story (2012, John Humphrey Centre for Peace and Human Rights)
 People's Citizenship Guide: A Response to Conservative Canada edited by Adele Perry and Esyllt Jones (2012, ARP Books)
 The Academy as Community: A Manual of Best Practices for Meeting the Needs of New Scholars (2004, Federation for the Humanities and Social Sciences)

External links
 OpenCanada Data Portal announces State Funding for Social Movements database
 The Royal Society of Canada (RSC) and its Members have elected this year’s new Fellows, and named the incoming class of The College of New Scholars, Artists and Scientists
 Canada's Human Rights History
State Funding for Social Movements
 Detailed biography and list of publications
 Canada's Rights Revolution
 Equality Deferred
 Human Rights in Canada
State Funding for Social Movements database
 Debating Dissent
Technology for Archival Research

Honours
Clément was elected to the Royal Society of Canada's College of New Scholars, Artists and Scientists in 2018. He was awarded the John Porter Traditional of Excellence Book Award from the Canadian Sociological Association for Canada’s Rights Revolution. His book, Equality Deferred, was awarded the Canadian Historical Association Clio Book Prize and an Honourable Mention for the Canadian Law and Society Association book award (it was also a finalist for the Canada Prize in Social Sciences and shortlisted for the Donald V. Smiley award from the Canadian Political Science Association). Another book, Human Rights in Canada, was a finalist for the INDIE Book Awards. In 2014,  2017, and 2022 he was awarded the Faculty of Arts Research Award at the University of Alberta and, in 2018, he was awarded the Bill Meloff Memorial Teaching Award at the University of Alberta.

References
 Biography on HistoryOfRights.ca
Open Canada
 Canada's Rights Revolution [in Japanese]
 Equality Deferred
 Human Rights in Canada
 Debating Rights Inflation
 Department of Sociology Faculty page

Living people
21st-century Canadian historians
Academic staff of the University of Alberta
University of British Columbia alumni
Memorial University of Newfoundland alumni
Year of birth missing (living people)